Qasemabad (also Romanized as Qāsemābād; also known as Nasīmābād-e Bālā and Qāsimābād) is a village in Karvan-e Sofla Rural District, Karvan District, Tiran and Karvan County, Isfahan Province, Iran. At the 2006 census, its population was 943, in 240 families.

References 

Populated places in Tiran and Karvan County